Carey Law School or Carey Law may refer to:
 The University of Maryland Francis King Carey School of Law
 The University of Pennsylvania Carey Law School